Bridgman High School is a public high school located in Bridgman, Michigan.  It is part of the Bridgman Public Schools district.

References

Schools in Berrien County, Michigan
Public high schools in Michigan